The Vasquez Rocks, situated in the Sierra Pelona Mountains, in northern Los Angeles County, California, have been used as a setting for key scenes in many motion pictures, television shows, music videos, and video games. The following is a partial list of such multimedia in which the rock formations are included:

Film

 Alpha Dog (2007)
 Angry Video Game Nerd: The Movie (2014)
 Apache (1954)
 Army of Darkness (1992)
 Austin Powers: International Man of Mystery (1997)
 Bill & Ted's Bogus Journey (1991)
 Blazing Saddles (1974)
 Bubble Boy (2001)
 Cars (2006)
 The Charge at Feather River (1953)
 Danger! Danger! (2021)
 Deathsport (1978)
 Delta Farce (2007)
 Dracula (1931)
 The Duel at Silver Creek (1952)
 Epoch (2000)
 The Flintstones (1994)
 For the Boys (1991)
 Forbidden World (1982)
 Free Enterprise (1998)
 Galaxy Quest (1999)
 Guns of El Chupacabra (1997)
 Hail, Caesar! (2016)
 Hearts of the West (1975)
 Hell Comes to Frogtown (1987)
 Holes (2003)
 In the Army Now (1994)
 Jay and Silent Bob Strike Back (2001)
 Jingle All the Way (1996)
 Joe Dirt (2001)
 John Carter (2012)
 Kill Your Darlings (2006)
 Little Miss Sunshine (2006)
 Nick Knight (1989)
 The Magnificent Seven Ride! (1972)
 Metalstorm: The Destruction of Jared-Syn (1983)
 Mighty Morphin Power Rangers: The Movie (1995)
 Missile to the Moon (1958)
 Mom and Dad Save the World (1992)
 The Muppet Movie (1979)
 My Stepmother Is an Alien (1988)
 Nickelodeon (1976)
 One Million B.C. (1940)
 Parasite (1982)
 Planet of Dinosaurs (1978)
 Planet of the Apes (2001)
 Princess of Mars (2009)
 The Rapture (1991)
 The Sea of Grass (1947)
 Secrets (1933)
 Short Circuit (1986)
 A Single Man (2009)
 Solar Crisis (1990)
 Son of the Border (1933)
 Space Raiders (1983)
 Star Trek (2009)
 Star Trek Into Darkness (2013)
 Star Trek IV: The Voyage Home (1986)
 The Ten Commandments (1956)
 Thief of Damascus (1952)
 A Thousand and One Nights (1945)
 To the Bone (2017)
 Very Bad Things (2006)
 Wavelength (1983)
 We're in the Legion Now! (1936)
 Werewolf of London (1935)

Television

 24
 The A-Team
 The Adventures of Champion
 The Adventures of Rin Tin Tin
 Airwolf
 Alias
 Alias Smith and Jones
 Alien Hunter
 Alien Nation
 Annie Oakley
 Bat Masterson
 Battlestar Galactica
Benson 
 The Big Bang Theory
 The Big Valley
 The Bionic Woman
 Bonanza
 Bones
 Branded
 Broken Arrow
 Buck Rogers in the 25th Century
 Buffalo Bill, Jr.
 Buffy the Vampire Slayer
 Charmed
 Cheyenne
 Cimarron Strip
 The Cisco Kid
 Cousin Skeeter
 CSI: Crime Scene Investigation
 Daniel Boone
 Death Valley Days
 Dinosaurs
 Fantasy Island
 The Fall Guy
 Fastlane
 Fear Factor
 Firefly
 For All Mankind
 Friends
 The Fugitive
 The Gene Autry Show
 The Greatest American Hero
 Gunsmoke
 Have Gun – Will Travel
 Hell Town
 The High Chaparral
 Hondo
 Hunter
 The Incredible Hulk
 The Invaders
 JAG
 Johnny Ringo
 Korg: 70,000 B.C.
 Kung Fu
 Laramie
 Las Vegas
 Lassie
 Logan's Run
 The Lone Ranger
 MacGyver
 The Man from U.N.C.L.E.
 Maverick
 Medium
 The Middleman
 Mighty Morphin Power Rangers
 Mission: Impossible
 Monk
 Mr. Show with Bob and David
 NCIS
 NCIS: Los Angeles
 New Girl
 New Monkees
 Numb3rs
 The Outer Limits (1963–65)
 Paradise
 Power Rangers Lost Galaxy
 Power Rangers Turbo
 Power Rangers Zeo
 The Pretender
 Prey
 Project U.F.O.
 The Range Rider
 The Rat Patrol
 The Rifleman
 The Rough Riders
 Roswell
 Room 104
 Saving Grace
 Simon & Simon
 The Six Million Dollar Man
 Sliders
 Space: Above and Beyond
 Stage 7
 Star Trek
 Star Trek: Deep Space Nine
 Star Trek: Enterprise
 Star Trek: Picard
 Star Trek: The Next Generation
 Star Trek: Voyager
 Stories of the Century
 Street Hawk
 Tales from the Crypt
 Tales of the 77th Bengal Lancers
 Tales of Wells Fargo
 The Tall Man
 Teen Wolf
 The Texan
 Tombstone Territory
 Touch
 The Twilight Zone
 Voyagers!
 Wanted Dead or Alive
 The Westerner
 Westworld
 The Wild Wild West
 Zane Grey Theatre
 Zorro

The rocks were drawn into the animated series Futurama and Star Trek: Lower Decks, depicting various alien landscapes as they did in other science fiction series, and they were also animated in the film  Shrek (2001).

Music videos
 "About a Girl" by Sugababes
 "Be with You" by Enrique Iglesias
 "Black or White" by Michael Jackson
 "Can't Believe a Single Word" by VHS OR BETA
 "Crawl Back In" by Dead By Sunrise
 "Drip Drop" by Lee Tae-min from "Press It"
 "Drummer Boy" by Debi Nova
 "Far Side of Crazy" by Wall Of Voodoo
 "The Future's So Bright, I Gotta Wear Shades" by Timbuk3
 "Heaven Is a Halfpipe" by OPM
 "Heavy Metal and Reflective" by Azealia Banks
 "High and Dry" (UK version) by Radiohead
 "I Know You" by Lil Skies & Yung Pinch
 "Love's Just a Feeling" by Lindsey Stirling featuring Rooty
 "Mind's Eye" by Wolfmother
 "Mobscene" by Marilyn Manson
 "On" by BTS from Map of the Soul: 7 (2020)
 "Rehab" by Rihanna (featuring Justin Timberlake)
 "Resta in ascolto" by Laura Pausini
 "S Club Party" by S Club 7 (also used for their 1999 TV special Back to the 50's)
 "Sanctuary" by Joji
 "Solitary Confinement" by Evidence (feat. Krondon) from The Layover EP DVD
 "Sora ni Kakeru Hashi (空にかける橋?)" by Masami Okui
 "Steal My Girl" by One Direction 
 "This Darkened Heart" by All That Remains
 "This Ladder is Ours" by The Joy Formidable
 "Too Much to Think" by 311
 "Turnaround" by Stealin Horses
 "When the Curtain Falls" by Greta Van Fleet
 "Work The Angles" by Dilated Peoples from The Platform
 "You Got Lucky" by Tom Petty and the Heartbreakers

The cover of Village People's album Cruisin' was shot at Vasquez Rocks.

Video games
 Prey, a video game by 3D Realms and Human Head Studios

See also
Movie ranch
Studio zone
Category: Western (genre)

Notes

Vasquez
+Vasquez
+Vasquez
History of Los Angeles County, California
Vasquez
Vasquez Rocks, films